The 38th King's Cup finals were held from 22 to 29 December 2007 at the Rajamangala Stadium in Bangkok, Thailand. The King's Cup (คิงส์คัพ) is an annual football tournament; the first tournament was played in 1968. 

Hosts Thailand won the tournament beating the B-Side of Iraq 1–0 in the final. Uzbekistan and Korea DPR were the other teams to play in this tournament. Iraq B-Side was represented by Erbil SC.

There was no prize money for the participants.

Matches

Round robin tournament

Final

Winner

Scorers 
2 goals:
  Wissam Zaki
  Sarayoot Chaikamdee
  Nataporn Phanrit
  Pavel Solomin
  Farhod Tadjiyev
1 goal:
  Muslim Mubarak
  Ahmed Salah
  Khaldoun Ibrahim
  An Chol-hyok
  Kim Kum-il
  Patiparn Phetphun
  Narongchai Vachiraban
  Timur Yafarov

Own goals
 Ahmad Abd Ali (playing against Thailand)

External links
RSSSF

King's Cup
Kings Cup, 2007